This is a list of newspapers in Honduras.

Newspapers 
 Diez
 La Gazzeta (official government newspaper)
 El Caribe
 El Heraldo
 Honduras This Week (in English)
 Honduras Weekly (in English)
 El Periódico
 La Prensa
 El Tiempo
 La Tribuna (Honduras)

See also
Media of Honduras

References

Further reading

External links
list of newspapers from Honduras at NewspaperIndex.com
 

Honduras
Newspapers